Diego Gonzalo Vega Martínez (born June 29, 1992 in Montevideo) is a Uruguayan footballer who plays as a midfielder.

Career
Vega grew up in the Club Nacional de Fútbol youth system. On 29 April 2012, he made his professional debut on a 0-1 away win against El Tanque Sisley, subsitituing Maximiliano Calzada in the 82 minute. He was never able to be part of the first eleven and therefore was sent on loan to Centro Atlético Fénix.

In mid 2014, he went on loan for a season to Rampla Juniors to play more matches.

In mid 2015, he was transferred to Sud América were he played 35 matches and scored 6 goals.

In January 2018, he was signed a three-year deal with Puskás Akadémia FC of the Nemzeti Bajnokság I.

References

External links

1992 births
Living people
Uruguayan footballers
Association football midfielders
Uruguayan Primera División players
Uruguayan Segunda División players
Nemzeti Bajnokság I players
Club Atlético River Plate (Montevideo) players
Fénix players
Rampla Juniors players
Puskás Akadémia FC players
Sud América players
Club Nacional de Football players
C.A. Rentistas players
Uruguayan expatriate footballers
Expatriate footballers in Hungary
Uruguayan expatriate sportspeople in Hungary